Joseph Aloysius Durick (October 13, 1914 – June 26, 1994) was an American prelate of the Roman Catholic Church.  He served as bishop of the Diocese of Nashville in Tennessee from 1969 to 1975.  He previously served as an auxiliary bishop of the Archdiocese of Mobile-Birmingham in Alabama from 1954 to 1963 and as coadjutor bishop of Nashville from 1963 to 1969.

Durick publicly opposed United States participation in the Vietnam War and the death penalty, which led to criticism from conservative circles. Durick also directed efforts at ecumenical cooperation with Protestant and Jewish communities in Tennessee, as well as introducing Project Equality. He had the image of an amiable country vicar, so much so that the newspapers called him "the happy priest."

Biography

Early life 
Joseph Durick was born on October 13, 1914, in Dayton, Tennessee,  the seventh of twelve children. He grew up in Bessemer, Alabama, during the height of anti-Catholic violence in that state.

After deciding not to pursue a music career, Durick began studies for the priesthood. He entered St. Bernard College in Cullman, Alabama,graduating in 1933. In 1936,  he completed coursework in philosophy at St. Mary's Seminary and University in Baltimore, Maryland.  He later received a degree in theology from the Pontifical Urbaniana University in Rome.

Durick was ordained in Rome by Cardinal James Gibbons for the Archdiocese of Mobile on March 23, 1940.  Durick soon became the assistant director of Catholic missions in North Alabama; by 1943 he was the director.

Auxiliary Bishop of Mobile-Birmingham 
On December 30, 1954, Pope Pius XII appointed Durick as an auxiliary bishop of the Archdiocese of Mobile-Birmingham and titular bishop of Cerbali. He was consecrated on March 24, 1955, by Archbishop Thomas Joseph Toolen. Durick's episcopal motto was "The love of Christ impels us" (Caritas Christi urget nos).  At age 40, he was one of the youngest American bishops.

April 12, 1963, Durick signed an open public letter urging African-Americans to withdraw their support of Dr. Martin Luther King Jr., to which Dr. King responded in his April 16 "Letter from Birmingham Jail".

Coadjutor Bishop and Bishop of Nashville 
On December 11, 1963, Paul VI appointed Durick as coadjutor bishop of the Diocese of Nashville with right of succession to Bishop William Adrian.  Durick was installed on March 3, 1964.

Durick was inspired to lead the Catholic Church in Tennessee into a new era by the reforms initiated by Pope John XXIII in the Second Vatican Council. To help present his reforms, Durick consulted with Catholic laymen, as well as a number of journalists including John Popham, John Seigenthaler, Joe Sweat, and Father Owen Campion.

Originally a conformist cleric, Durick and seven other colleagues wrote the letter "A Call For Unity", calling on King and "outsiders" during the Birmingham protests of 1963 to stop and let the courts work toward integration. King responded with his "Letter from Birmingham Jail", voicing disappointment in the white clergy, who should be "among our strongest allies". This, and the message he got from Vatican II, led Durick to become a strong voice for civil rights  in the segregated South, for which he was called a heretic and a communist by his tradition-bound congregation. In 1968–1969 especially, he faced serious opposition in the form of boycotts of his public appearances.

On September 10, 1969, Durick succeeded Adrian as bishop of Nashville.

Resignation and legacy 
On April 2, 1975, Paul VI accepted Durick's resignation as bishop of the Diocese of Nashville. He spent the next six years working in prison ministry. He was then forced to semi-retire due to a severe heart problem and underwent cardiac surgery.

Joseph Durick died of cancer on July 26, 1994, at age 79 at his home in Bessemer.

References

Sources

External links 
 Joseph Aloysius Durick Findagrave.com
 Joseph Aloysius Durick: Tennessee Encyclopedia of History and Culture
 Joseph Aloysius Durick: Diocese of Nashville Profile
 St. Mary's Seminary and University

Episcopal succession

1914 births
1994 deaths
20th-century Roman Catholic bishops in the United States
Participants in the Second Vatican Council
People from Bessemer, Alabama
People from Dayton, Tennessee
Roman Catholic bishops of Nashville
St. Mary's Seminary and University alumni
Catholics from Alabama